Andreas Heinz (born 5 April 1991) is a German male badminton player. He started playing badminton at 1999, and joined the Germany national badminton team in 2006.

Achievements

European Games
Men's Doubles

European Junior Badminton Championships 
Boys' Doubles

BWF Grand Prix (2 runners-up) 
The BWF Grand Prix has two level such as Grand Prix and Grand Prix Gold. It is a series of badminton tournaments, sanctioned by Badminton World Federation (BWF) since 2007.

Men's Doubles

 BWF Grand Prix Gold tournament
 BWF Grand Prix tournament

BWF International Challenge/Series (2 titles, 7 runners-up)
Men's doubles

Mixed doubles

 BWF International Challenge tournament
 BWF International Series tournament
 BWF Future Series tournament

References

External links
 
 
 

1991 births
Living people
People from Groß-Gerau
Sportspeople from Darmstadt (region)
German male badminton players
Badminton players at the 2015 European Games
European Games bronze medalists for Germany
European Games medalists in badminton
21st-century German people